University Book Store is an independent and privately owned bookstore headquartered in the University District of Seattle, Washington, United States.  University Book Store began serving the University of Washington in 1900, and is the oldest and largest independent bookstore in Washington State.  

In 2014, it was reported that University Book Store sold more books and supplies than any other college bookstore in the United States.  In 2020, it was the third largest university bookstore in the country.

In addition to its main location, there are several other branches located on the University of Washington campus and elsewhere in western Washington state.  A branch located in Bellevue, Washington closed in 2017.

History
University Book Store opened in the University of Washington's Denny Hall in 1900.  Its location moved several times on the campus over the years before moving to its present location on University Way in 1924.

The store was incorporated in 1932 and has been governed by a Board of Trustees since 1964. It is one of few college stores that is organized as an independent tax paying corporation with direct student involvement on the board of directors.

References

External links

Independent bookstores of the United States
University of Washington
1900 establishments in Washington (state)
Companies based in Seattle
University District, Seattle